The Son of Robin Hood is a 1958 American adventure DeLuxe color CinemaScope film directed by George Sherman, starring David Hedison and June Laverick.

Plot
The imposter son of Robin Hood gets locked up in the dungeon. His brother later gets locked up in the dungeon in the next cell. He calls out to him 'Robert, Robert' but he does not believe it his real brother saying that he lies in a foreign grave. He takes off a ring and ties it to some string and swings it to the next cell. When Robert sees the ring his brother tells him that it is the ring he gave him when he left for a foreign land that nobody else knows about and so he realizes that it really is his brother Jamie. He tells him that there is a plan to break him out of the dungeon. Then Jamie is taken to torture a forester Des Roches has captured. Jamie delays the torture until a guard interrupts with a blue cloak dropped by Deering Hood when she went to shoot the Hawk carrying a message from the traitor lady in the priory. Des Roches cries seize him but he uses the dagger given him to torture the forester and takes the guards sword. He engages in a sword fight managing to free the imprisoned forester. Together they escape and open the gate to the secret tunnel letting Little John, Deering and some of Robin Hood's allies into the castle of Des Roches. Jamie then goes back to fight Des Roches and kills him. Little John fights with the guards and manages to lower the drawbridge to let the rest of Robin Hoods men in and the castle is secured. Des Roches had won the support of many Lords and their Knights who are gathering for the coronation of the King in Winchester. But now without his leadership they can support the King at his coronation in place of Des Roches. Jamie declares his love for Deering and they kiss as acceptance of marriage. Jamie pardons Sylvia Des Roches' sister as she helped their cause to defeat Des Roches. everyone lives happily ever after.

Cast

Critical reception
Leonard Maltin called the film a "Bland forest tale"; whereas Sky Cinema praised "The hearty features" of  George Woodbridge as a "robust Little John," though was less happy with the "somewhat rum casting" of George Coulouris as Alan A'Dale; but concluded, "Otherwise characterisation is in the best, full-blooded comic-strip tradition, as is the action, handled in highly professional style by the director. Laverick's finest hour."

References

External links 
 
 
 

1958 films
1950s historical adventure films
Robin Hood films
British historical adventure films
20th Century Fox films
Films directed by George Sherman
1950s English-language films
1950s British films